Tjeerd Boersma (22 February 1915 – 3 June 1985) was a Dutch sprinter. He competed in the men's 4 × 100 metres relay at the 1936 Summer Olympics.

References

External links
 

1915 births
1985 deaths
Athletes (track and field) at the 1936 Summer Olympics
Dutch male sprinters
Olympic athletes of the Netherlands
Place of birth missing
20th-century Dutch people